Dactyliandra is a genus of flowering plants belonging to the family Cucurbitaceae.

Its native range is Angola to Namibia.

Species:
 Dactyliandra welwitschii Hook.f.

References

Cucurbitaceae
Cucurbitaceae genera